Manawa Peter Gatkuoth (died 19 June 2022) was a South Sudanese politician. He was Minister of Water Resources from March 2020 until his death in 2022.

Personal life 
He hailed from the Lou Nuer community in Akobo County of Jonglei State

Death 
A three-day national mourning period was declared.

References 

20th-century births
2022 deaths
Year of birth missing
21st-century South Sudanese politicians
Government ministers of South Sudan
Water ministers
Nuer people
People from Jonglei State